The castles in  were chosen based on their significance in culture, history, and in their regions by the  in 2006.

In 2017, Japanese Castle Association created an additional finest 100 castles list as Continued Top 100 Japanese Castles.

Hokkaidō

Tōhoku region

Kantō and Kōshin'etsu region

Hokuriku region

Tōkai region

Kansai region

Chūgoku region

Shikoku region

Kyūshū region

Okinawa region

See also

List of castles in Japan
List of National Treasures of Japan (castles)
Continued Top 100 Japanese Castles

Notes

External links

Japan Castle Association

Lists of castles in Japan